Alexandria Ellis (born  1 August 1995) is a Canadian rugby union player. She plays Prop for Canada and for Saracens.

Ellis competed for Canada at the 2021 Rugby World Cup in New Zealand. She played against USA in the quarterfinal. She then featured in the semifinal against England, and in the third place final against France.

References 

1995 births
Canadian rugby union players
Living people
Canadian female rugby union players
Canada women's international rugby union players